Usman Saeed (born 8 October 1986) is a Pakistani cricketer who last played for Rawalpindi cricket team. He played in 124 first-class and 70 List A matches from 2004 to 2018.

References

External links
 

1986 births
Living people
Pakistani cricketers
Khan Research Laboratories cricketers
Pakistan Television cricketers
State Bank of Pakistan cricketers
Rawalpindi cricketers
Cricketers from Rawalpindi